Bellfountain is an unincorporated community in Noble Township, Jay County, in the U.S. state of Indiana.

History
The community may be named after Bellefontaine, Ohio. An old variant name of the community was called Hector.

Geography

References

Unincorporated communities in Jay County, Indiana
Unincorporated communities in Indiana